Khit er rouh, also known as Zerouf, is a type of diadem or headband made up of nineteen carved chatons linked together by rings, forming rosettes or rosaces and zerraref pendeloques made of gold set with diamonds or other precious stones. It is worn across the forehead with traditional outfits like the Karakou, where it is worn with a pair of earrings encrusted with tiny gemstones and several strands of baroque pearls. 

It is also worn with the Chedda of Tlemcen, accompanied by other ornaments such as the djébin, and can be worn around the neck.

The diadem is the favorite jewel of Algerian women, and it still accompanies the bridal outfit today. It is adorned with precious stones by wealthy city dwellers but does not serve to designate their social status. Women in Tlemcen wear three or four superimposed diadems.

Some models were made up of an assembly of diamonds forming rosettes of rubies and emeralds set in silver or gold opercula.

It is a millennia-old jewel that is part of the trousseau of the Algerian bride-to-be and can also be demanded as a dowry. It is passed down from mother to daughter, so some families in Algiers possess very ancient and therefore very expensive "khit er rouh".

Image gallery

References 

Algerian culture